US 1 is an American highway.

US 1 or US-1 may also refer to:

Shin Meiwa US-1A, a Japanese flying boat design
US1, an American sailboat design
U.S. 1 (comics), a comic book series
U.S. 1 (newspaper), a Princeton, New Jersey newspaper